The second USS Scout (SP-114) was an armed steamboat that served in the United States Navy as a patrol vessel in 1917.
 
Scout was built as a civilian pleasure craft in 1900 by the Herreshoff Manufacturing Company at Bristol, Rhode Island. The U.S. Navy acquired Scout from her owner, Mr. August Belmont of New York City, on 25 May 1917 for use as a patrol boat during World War I. She was commissioned on 25 June 1917 as USS Scout (SP-114).

Assigned to the 3rd Naval District, Scout served on patrol duty in the New York City area for five months.  Apparently she was unsuitable for naval service, because the Navy returned her to her owner on 12 December 1917.

References

Department of the Navy Naval Historical Center Online Library of Selected Images: Civilian Ships: Scout (American Steam Boat, 1900). Served as USS Scout (SP-114) in 1917
NavSource Online: Section Patrol Craft Photo Archive: Scout (SP 114)

Patrol vessels of the United States Navy
World War I patrol vessels of the United States
Ships built in Bristol, Rhode Island
1900 ships